John W. Tucker House is a historic home located near Tuckerdale, Ashe County, North Carolina.  It was built about 1883, and is a two-story, "T"-plan frame farmhouse with Greek Revival and Italianate style influences. The front facade features a two-tier porch. The house was restored in 1984.

It was listed on the National Register of Historic Places in 1985.

References

Houses on the National Register of Historic Places in North Carolina
Greek Revival houses in North Carolina
Italianate architecture in North Carolina
Houses completed in 1883
Houses in Ashe County, North Carolina
National Register of Historic Places in Ashe County, North Carolina